Oaths Act is a stock short title used in Canada, Malaysia and the United Kingdom for legislation relating to oaths and affirmation.

Oaths Acts is a term of art.

List

Canada 
 The Oaths Act, 1873 - disallowed by the government of the United Kingdom.

Malaysia
The Oaths and Affirmations Act 1949

United Kingdom
The Oaths of Minors Act 1681
The Oaths Act 1775
The Oaths Act 1838 (1 & 2 Vict c 105)
The Oaths Act 1858 (21 & 22 Vict. c.48)
The Oaths Act 1888 (51 & 52 Vict c 46)
The Oaths Act 1909 (9 Edw 7 c 39)
The Oaths Act 1961 (9 & 10 Eliz 2 C 21)
The Oaths And Evidence (Overseas Authorities And Countries) Act 1963 (c 27)
Section 8 of the Administration of Justice Act 1977 (c 38)
The Oaths Act 1978

The Oaths Acts

The Oaths Acts 1888 to 1977 meant the Oaths Acts 1888 to 1961 and section 8 of the Administration of Justice Act 1977.

The Coronation Oath Act 1567
The Coronation Oath Act 1688
The Promissory Oaths Act 1868 (31 & 32 Vict c 72)
The Promissory Oaths Act 1871 (34 & 35 Vict c 48)
The Parliamentary Oaths Act 1866
The Parliamentary Witnesses Oaths Act 1871
The Commissioners for Oaths Act 1891
The Commissioners for Oaths Act 1889
The False Oaths (Scotland) Act 1933

See also
List of short titles
Profane Oaths Act 1745
Unlawful Oaths Act 1797
Oaths Act, 1873

References

Lists of legislation by short title and collective title